Malta participated in the Junior Eurovision Song Contest 2018 on 25 November 2018 in Minsk, Belarus. The Maltese entrant for the 2018 contest was selected through a national final, organised by the Maltese broadcaster Public Broadcasting Services (PBS) on 8 September 2018. A total of 16 finalists performed original songs for the first time since 2010. Ela Mangion was chosen to represent the island nation with the song "Marchin' On".

Background

Prior to the 2017 Contest, Malta had participated in the Junior Eurovision Song Contest twelve times since its first entry in 2003 only opting not to participate at the 2011 and 2012 contests. Malta has won on two occasions: in 2013 when Gaia Cauchi won with the song "The Start", and again in 2015 when Destiny Chukunyere came first with "Not My Soul" when it won the contest with 185 points, breaking the previous record held by Spain for the most points ever given to a winner.

Before Junior Eurovision

Malta Junior Eurovision Song Contest 2018

Competing entries

Final 
The national final was held on 8 September 2018.

Artist and song information

Ela Mangion
Ela Mangion (born 6 January 2006) is a Maltese child singer. She represented Malta at the Junior Eurovision Song Contest 2018 in Minsk, Belarus with the song "Marchin' On". This is not to be confused with the OneRepublic song with the same name.

Marchin' On
"Marchin' On" is a song by Maltese child singer Ela Mangion. It represented Malta at the Junior Eurovision Song Contest 2018 in Minsk, Belarus.

At Junior Eurovision
During the opening ceremony and the running order draw which both took place on 19 November 2018, Malta was drawn to perform nineteenth on 25 November 2018, following Wales and preceding Poland.

Voting

Detailed voting results

References

Junior Eurovision Song Contest
Malta
2018